Hicoria was a town in Highlands County, Florida.

The town was located south of Florida State Road 70, between Old State Road 8 and U.S. Route 27. The Atlantic Coast Line Railroad had a stop at the town on their Haines City Branch. A lumber mill operated in Hicoria between 1928 and 1934.

References

Former populated places in Florida
Former populated places in Highlands County, Florida